Gudrun Sinnhuber (born 12 March 1966) is an Austrian sports shooter. She competed in the women's 10 metre air rifle event at the 1984 Summer Olympics.

References

1966 births
Living people
Austrian female sport shooters
Olympic shooters of Austria
Shooters at the 1984 Summer Olympics
Place of birth missing (living people)
20th-century Austrian women